L1ve to Love, Love to L1ve is a third studio album by Indonesian singer, Afgan. It was released on February 14, 2013 by Trinity Optima Production. The first single from this album, "Pesan Cinta", was released in November 2012.

This album contains ten tracks which also included songs that had already been released as a soundtrack a movie or television series. In marketing this album, Afgan and the record label working with KFC that this album will be circulated in all KFC stores in Indonesia.

Track listing

Certifications 

|}

References 

2013 albums